Arpheuilles-Saint-Priest is a commune in the Allier department in the Auvergne-Rhône-Alpes region of central France.

The inhabitants of the commune are known as Arpheuillais or Arpheuillaises.

Geography
Access to the commune is by the D69 road from Durdat-Larequille in the north-east passing through the village and continuing south-east to Ronnet. The D1089 branches off the D69 just north-west of the village and continues south-west to Marcillat-en-Combraille. The D460 from Ronnet going north to join the D2144 passes through the east of the commune. Apart from the village there are the hamlets of Villenette, La Naute, and L'Harpe. Apart from a large belt of forest in the north, the commune is entirely farmland.

The Banny river rises in the commune near the village and flows north-east to the Etang de la Ganne. The Ruisseau de Puy Clevaud rises near Villenette and flows south to join the Tartasse south of the commune.

Neighbouring communes and villages

History

Heraldry

Administration

List of Successive Mayors

Population

Distribution of Age Groups

Percentage Distribution of Age Groups in Arpheuilles-Saint-Priest and Allier Department in 2017

Source: INSEE

Sites and monuments

The Church of Saint Peter from the 19th century.

See also
Communes of the Allier department

References

External links
Arpheuilles-Saint-Priest on the National Geographic Institute website 
Arpheuilles-Saint-Priest on Géoportail, National Geographic Institute (IGN) website 
Arpheuille on the 1750 Cassini Map

Communes of Allier